Pramote Sangskulrote (born 5 July 1952) is a former Thai cyclist. He competed in the individual road race at the 1972 Summer Olympics.

References

External links
 

1952 births
Living people
Pramote Sangskulrote
Pramote Sangskulrote
Cyclists at the 1972 Summer Olympics
Place of birth missing (living people)
Pramote Sangskulrote